The 1983 World Table Tennis Championships men's doubles was the 37th edition of the men's doubles championship.

Dragutin Šurbek and Zoran Kalinić won the title after defeating Xie Saike and Jiang Jialiang in the final by three sets to two.

Results

See also
List of World Table Tennis Championships medalists

References

-